Andy Duncan (born 25 January 1911 in Renton–died 1983) was a professional footballer who played for Renton Thistle, Dumbarton, Hull City, Tottenham Hotspur and Chelmsford City.

Football career 
Duncan started his playing career at his local club Renton Thistle before joining Dumbarton. In 1930 the inside forward moved to Hull City where he played 105 matches and found the net on 31 occasions. Duncan joined Tottenham Hotspur in 1934 where he went on to feature in 103 games and scoring 26 goals in all competitions for the White Hart Lane club. After leaving the Spurs in 1938 he ended his playing career at Chelmsford City.

References 

1911 births
1983 deaths
Footballers from West Dunbartonshire
Scottish footballers
English Football League players
Dumbarton F.C. players
Tottenham Hotspur F.C. players
Hull City A.F.C. players
Chelmsford City F.C. players
Association football inside forwards
People from Renton, West Dunbartonshire